Happy Days (French: Les jours heureux) is a 1941 French comedy film directed by Jean de Marguenat and starring Pierre Richard-Willm, François Périer and Juliette Faber. It is based on a play of the same name by Claude-André Puget. It was remade as an Italian film Happy Days the following year.

The film's sets were designed by the art director Roland Quignon.

Cast
 Pierre Richard-Willm as Michel 
 François Périer as Bernard 
 Juliette Faber as Pernette 
 Monique Thibaut as Marianne 
 André Bervil as Olivier 
 Janine Viénot as Francine 
 Jean Clarieux
 Paul Barré
 Léonce Corne

References

Bibliography 
 Rège, Philippe. Encyclopedia of French Film Directors, Volume 1. Scarecrow Press, 2009.

External links 
 

1941 films
French comedy films
1941 comedy films
1940s French-language films
Films directed by Jean de Marguenat
French black-and-white films
French films based on plays
1940s French films